Fassala , Fassale, Fessale, or Vassale is a town and commune in the Hodh Ech Chargui Region of south-eastern Mauritania, on the Malian border.

In 2000 it had a population of 10,982.

References

Communes of Hodh Ech Chargui Region